Wexton is a surname. Notable people with the surname include:

 Jennifer Wexton (born 1968), American lawyer and politician
 Scott Wexton, American musician

See also
 Weston (surname)